Flight Lieutenant Henry Wallace McLeod DSO, DFC and Bar (17 December 1915 – 27 September 1944) was a Canadian fighter pilot and flying ace with the Royal Canadian Air Force during the Second World War. He achieved a total of 21 enemy aircraft destroyed, three probably destroyed, and 11 damaged, and one shared damaged. McLeod scored 13 of kills during the Battle of Malta, earning the nickname "The Eagle of Malta".

Early life
Henry McLeod was born in Regina, Saskatchewan to James Archibald McLeod, and Hannah Elizabeth McLeod on 17 December 1915.
James McLeod was from Brooklyn, Nova Scotia and went to Acadia University. At the time of James' death, long after World War II, he was reputed to be the oldest living graduate of Acadia. McLeod's mother, Hannah, died from Spanish flu, during the pandemic, when he was three. McLeod was an average student, never excelling, but always managing pass grades. From a young age he had a reputation as a fast learner.

McLeod began his military career in 1928, serving with the 5th Saskatchewan Regiment and Regina Rifle Regiment until 1934. McLeod joined the Royal Canadian Air Force on 2 September 1940. He graduated from training on 1 April 1941 and arrived in Great Britain on 9 May 1941, attending 57 OTU.

Second World War

RCAF
McLeod began fighter sweeps over France in July 1941 with No. 485 Squadron and No. 411 RCAF. By May 1942 he had scored five victories. On 13 October 1942 McLeod was awarded the Distinguished Flying Cross. The citation read:

Soon afterwards McLeod was moved to No. 603 Squadron on Malta and in July joined No 1435 Squadron. On 3 November 1942, he received a Bar to his DFC for his actions in the island's defence. It is believed McLeod was credited with 12 enemy aircraft at this point. During his time in Malta, it is thought McLeod may have shot down and killed the 47 victory ace Heinz "Figaro" Golinski on 16 October 1942. The citation read:

On 4 December 1942 it was reported that McLeod had been sent for a rest in Britain after destroying 13 enemy aircraft in three months. Included in his claims were seven Messerschmitt Bf 109s, three Junkers Ju 88s and three Macchi C.202.

On 5 September 1944 McLeod was appointed a Companion of the Distinguished Service Order for 250 missions and 21 aerial victories, plus three probably destroyed and 12 damaged. McLeod scored most of his kills in the Spitfire Mk V, scoring 13 kills, two probables, 11 damaged and 1 shared damaged. The citation read:

Death
On 27 September 1944, McLeod was leading a section of six aircraft of his squadron on high patrol as part of the fighter Wing led by Wing Commander James "Johnnie" Johnson over Nijmegen, Netherlands. During the action McLeod went missing. Johnson made repeated calls over the R/T, but McLeod did not answer.  After landing, Johnson could see his friend had not returned. Johnson questioned the rest of the pilots and one reported seeing Wally chasing a lone Messerschmitt. Knowing McLeod's character, Johnson believed he would have attacked regardless of the enemy fighter's advantage:

I feel certain that he wouldn't have let go of the 109 until the issue had been decided one way or the other. There was no other aircraft in the area [that Johnson had seen] and they must have fought it out together, probably above the cloud. To start with he would have been at a disadvantage, for the 109 was already several thousand feet higher. I think the Messerschmitt got him. It was always all or nothing for Wally.

Remains of his Spitfire IX (NH425) were discovered in September 1949. McLeod was still in the wreckage of his Spitfire, in the outskirts of Wesel, near Duisburg, just inside the German border. He was buried in the Commonwealth War Graves Commission cemetery at Rheinberg. McLeod may have been shot down by Major Siegfried Freytag of Jagdgeschwader 77 flying a Bf 109, who claimed on this day, the only Spitfire shot down in the Duisburg area near Wesel for his 101st victory.

Honours and tributes
In September 2002, a building at 15 Wing, the military air training base south of Moose Jaw was named for Henry Wallace McLeod. A McLeod Street in Regina's industrial district is jointly named for him and for broadcaster Jim McLeod (no relation).

References 
Notes

Bibliography

 Henry Wallace "Wally" Mcleod
 Johnson, J.E. Wing Leader. London: Goodall Publications Ltd., (original edition 1956), 2000. .
 McCaffrey, Dan. Air Aces: The Lives and Times of Twelve Canadian Fighter Pilots. Toronto: James Lorimer & Company, 1990. .
 Price, Dr. Alfred. Spitfire Mark V Aces 1941–1945. London: Osprey, 1997. .
 Ralph, Wayne. Aces, Warriors and Wingmen: The Firsthand Accounts of Canada's Fighter Pilots in the Second World War. Toronto: Wiley, 2005. .
 Shores, Christopher and Clive Williams. Aces High. London: Grub Street, 1994. .

1915 births
Canadian military personnel from Saskatchewan
1944 deaths
Canadian World War II flying aces
Canadian World War II pilots
Canadian Companions of the Distinguished Service Order
People from Regina, Saskatchewan
Recipients of the Distinguished Flying Cross (United Kingdom)
Royal Canadian Air Force personnel of World War II
Canadian military personnel killed in World War II
Aviators killed by being shot down
Royal Canadian Air Force officers